Milena Vicenová (born 12 August 1955, in Přerov) is a former Minister of Agriculture of the Czech Republic. After that she became an EU project manager of the Technology Agency of the Czech Republic. She had also been the Czech Ambassador to the European Union.

References 

1955 births
Living people
People from Přerov
Agriculture ministers of the Czech Republic
Czech diplomats
Civic Democratic Party (Czech Republic) Government ministers
21st-century Czech women politicians
Women government ministers of the Czech Republic